Linus Bolzern (born 11 April 1999) is a Swiss male canoeist who was 6th in the K1 sprint senior final at the 2019 Wildwater Canoeing World Championships.

References

External links
 

1999 births
Living people
Swiss male canoeists
Place of birth missing (living people)